Filmworks VII: Cynical Hysterie Hour is a 1989 album by John Zorn featuring music written for a series of Japanese animated shorts that were created by Kiriko Kubo. It features Zorn's first music for cartoons and was originally released on the Japanese Sony label in limited numbers. In late 1996 Zorn finally attained the rights for his music and remastered and re-released the album on his own label, Tzadik, in 1997.

Reception
The Allmusic review by Joclyn Layne awarded the album 3 stars stating "Bursts of TV rock, synth whistles and barks, banjo licks, and sound effects intensify the caffeinated jumping through genre hoops of this slick and cinematically silly music".

Track listing

All compositions by John Zorn

Personnel
 Tracks 1–6 recorded at Shelly Palmer Studio, New York City in October 1988
 Bill Frisell - electric guitar, banjo
 Carol Emanuel - harp
 Wayne Horvitz - keyboards
 Kermit Driscoll - acoustic & electric bass
 Bobby Previte - drums, percussion
 Cyro Baptista - Brazilian percussion
 Christian Marclay - turntables
 Tracks 7–14 recorded at Shelly Palmer Studio, New York City in October 1988
 Arto Lindsay - electric guitar
 Robert Quine - electric guitar
 Marc Ribot - electric guitar, banjo
 Carol Emanuel - harp
 Peter Scherer - keyboards
 David Hofstra - acoustic & electric bass
 Cyro Baptista - Brazilian percussion
 Bobby Previte - drums, percussion
 Tracks 15–18 recorded at Shelly Palmer Studio, New York City in January 1989
 Marc Ribot - acoustic & electric guitar, banjo
 Carol Emanuel - harp
 Jill Jaffee - violin, viola
 Maxine Neuman - cello
 Peter Scherer - keyboards
 David Hofstra - acoustic & electric bass, tuba
 Cyro Baptista - Brazilian percussion
 Ikue Mori - drum machine
 '''Tracks 19–26 recorded at Shelly Palmer Studio, New York City in January 1989
 Bill Frisell - electric & acoustic guitar, banjo
 Robert Quine - electric guitar
 Carol Emanuel - harp
 Peter Scherer - keyboards
 David Hofstra - electric & acoustic bass, tuba
 Cyro Baptista - Brazilian percussion
 Bobby Previte - drums, percussion
 Arto Lindsay - vocal
 Kiriko Kubo - vocal

References

1989 soundtrack albums
Albums produced by John Zorn
Anime soundtracks
John Zorn soundtracks
Soundtrack compilation albums
Tzadik Records compilation albums
Tzadik Records soundtracks